Socket FS1b (rebranded as Socket AM1 ) is a socket designed by AMD, launched in April 2014 for desktop SoCs in the value segment. Socket AM1 is intended for a class of CPUs that contain both an integrated GPU and a chipset, essentially forming a complete SoC implementation, and as such has pins for display, PCI Express, SATA, and other I/O interfaces directly in the socket. AMD's first compatible CPUs, designated as APUs, are 4 socketable chips in the Kabini family of the Jaguar microarchitecture, marketed under the Athlon and Sempron names and announced on April 9, 2014.

The brand names are Athlon and Sempron. The underlying microarchitectures are Jaguar and Puma. All products are SoCs, this means the Chipset is on the die of the APU and not on the motherboard.

While the AMD mobile CPUs are available in a 722-pin package Socket FS1, it is not clear whether these notebook CPUs are compatible with Socket AM1 or vice versa.

Its mobile counterpart is Socket FT3 (BGA-769).

At least one board is supported by coreboot.

Products

APUs

See also 
 List of AMD processors with 3D graphics
 List of AMD mobile microprocessors

References

AMD sockets